Super Express is a 2016 Chinese action comedy film directed by Song Xiao and starring Chen He, Song Ji-hyo, David Belle, Xiao Yang, Li Yuan, Mason Lee, Tai Chih-yuan, He Saifei, Kan Qingzi. It was released in China by Fundamental Films on December 2, 2016.

Plot
The movie begins with the robbery of a cat statue relic exhibited at a museum in Marseille, France. Maggie (Song Ji-hyo), Head of Security for the museum, gives chase after the robber, Gary (David Belle) but he manages to escape.

Next plot sees Mali (Chen He) racing down the busy city streets of Shanghai on a small motorbike to deliver a package to a client on time. He makes it as the digital clock ticks down to the very last second. Later, he goes to play mahjong with his future mother-in-law (He Saifei) and her clique of friends as Nana (Li Yuan) his girlfriend watches. His future mother-in-law does not think much of him and belittles him as they play. He wins all the games to the extremely obvious displeasure and disgruntlement of his future mother-in-law.

At the office, Mali's boss, Lao Qian (Tai Chih-yuan) entices him to make a delivery to a very important  client, Wang Sangbiao (Xiao Yang) whom he disdains very much despite his initial refusal. He completes his delivery after manoeuvring his way through his usual back alleys and overcoming the obstructions put up by the residents there.

At Wang Sangbiao's residence, he is met by Maggie at the door. Here begins Mali's adventures with Maggie, being flying-kicked, punched  and tied up by Maggie, being chased by Gary and his assistant, Ryan (Mason Lee), chasing Gary and Ryan, rescuing Nana from Gary and Ryan, finally fighting Gary and Ryan in a speedboat. All because of the stolen cat statue relic. The movie ends on a happy note.

Cast
 Chen He as Mali
 Song Ji-hyo as Maggie / Meixi
 David Belle as Gary
 Xiao Yang as Wang Sangbiao
 Li Yuan as Nana
Mason Lee as Ryan
Tai Chih-yuan as Lao Qian
He Saifei as Nana's mother
Kan Qingzi as Dandan

Reception
The film grossed  in China.

References

External links

2016 films
Chinese action comedy films
2016 action comedy films
Fundamental Films films